Hegel's Ontology and the Theory of Historicity is a 1932 book about the philosopher Georg Wilhelm Friedrich Hegel and his theory of historicity by the philosopher Herbert Marcuse. It is influenced by the philosopher Martin Heidegger.

The book received positive reviews upon its publication in English translation in 1987. It is considered essential for understanding Marcuse's later intellectual development. However, the book has been criticized for Marcuse's failure to define the term "historicity".

Summary

Marcuse attempts to reinterpret the works of Georg Wilhelm Friedrich Hegel, including The Phenomenology of Spirit (1807) and the Science of Logic (1812), and "to disclose and to ascertain the fundamental characteristics of historicity", the factors that "define history" and distinguish it from other phenomena such as nature. He also discuses other works of Hegel such as The Difference Between Fichte's and Schelling's Systems of Philosophy (1801), the Philosophy of Nature portion of the Encyclopedia of the Philosophical Sciences (1817), Lectures on the Philosophy of History (1837), and Lectures on the History of Philosophy. Other topics considered include Hegel's relationship to philosophers such as Aristotle, Immanuel Kant, Johann Gottlieb Fichte, and Friedrich Wilhelm Joseph Schelling, and the work of the philosopher Wilhelm Dilthey. Marcuse acknowledges the influence of Martin Heidegger on his work.

Background and publication history

According to the philosopher Seyla Benhabib, Hegel's Ontology and the Theory of Historicity was originally intended to be Marcuse's Habilitationsschrift, which would have earned him the right to teach in German universities. She writes that some accounts claim that the work was rejected as a Habilitationsschrift, while others suggest that it may never have been submitted, due to Marcuse realizing that he would never be permitted to teach in Nazi Germany. The work was first published in German in 1932 under the title Hegels Ontologie und die Grundlegung einer Theorie der Geschichtlichkeit. In 1968, an unrevised version was published in German under the title Hegels Ontologie und die Theorie der Geschichtlichkeit. An Italian translation was published in 1969 by La Nuova Italia, a Spanish translation by Manuel Sacristán was published in 1970 by Ediciones Martínez Roca de Barcelona, and a French translation was published in 1972 by Les Éditions de Minuit. In 1987, the book appeared for the first time in English, in a translation by Benhabib published by MIT Press as part of the series Studies in Contemporary German Social Thought.

Reception
Hegel's Ontology and the Theory of Historicity received a mixed review from the philosopher Theodor W. Adorno in the Zeitschrift für Sozialforschung. The book's English translation received positive reviews from Brent Nelson in Library Journal, the sociologist George E. McCarthy in Contemporary Sociology, and H. N. Tuttle in Choice. The translation also received a mixed review from K. R. Dove in The Philosophical Review, and was discussed by Adam Sitze in Theory and Event.

According to Benhabib, Adorno noted that the work advanced an interpretation of historicity that departed from Heidegger's views, moving from the "meaning of Being" toward the disclosure of beings, from fundamental ontology toward the philosophy of history, and from historicity toward history. In Adorno's view, this made the work both significant and vulnerable to criticism. He noted that Marcuse did not ask if the question of the "material constitution of historicity" is compatible with an ontological investigation or whether it must lead to a materialist theory of society and history.

Nelson wrote that the book "shows little of the Marcuse who became a popular New Left theorist" but would nevertheless "be of interest to students of 19th- and 20th-century philosophy." He noted that the work, "highly technical in its vocabulary", had a helpful glossary. McCarthy wrote that the book was "one of those rare jewels which has remained hidden from the English-speaking world for over fifty years" and "an extremely important work for understanding the foundations of Marcuse's own intellectual perspective and his later theoretical developments". In his view, it "recaptures the heart of Hegel's philosophical vision of reality, indirectly shows its importance for social theory, and breathes life into the most difficult of Hegel's writings." Tuttle described the book as "Marcuse's most important and certainly his most fundamental work" and "a philosophical classic", and recommended it "without qualification to advanced undergraduates and graduate students." He considered it less ideological than Marcuse's later writings, but essential for understanding Marcuse's Eros and Civilization (1955) and One-Dimensional Man (1964).

Dove described the book as an important part of the Hegel scholarship produced between World War I and World War II, comparing it to the work of the philosophers Richard Kroner and Nicolai Hartmann. He noted that the philosopher Allan Bloom considered the book a serious work of Hegel scholarship, referring to it, although not by name, in The Closing of the American Mind (1987). Dove praised Marcuse's interpretation of the Science of Logic, but considered his interpretation of The Phenomenology of Spirit less successful, noting that his later work shows his awareness of its shortcomings. He also criticized the "tortuous Germanic style" of the book, as well as its failure to define the term "historicity". Sitze argued that the book was part of a "dispute with Martin Heidegger" and "revolves around an antithesis to life that is neither death nor unlivability, but paralysis."

Benhabib commented in her introduction to the work that it was the culmination of a period of Marcuse's intellectual development in which he espoused views that have been referred to as "Heideggerian Marxism", "phenomenological Marxism", or "existential Marxism". She maintained that it is crucial for understanding Marcuse's relationship to Heidegger, for "illuminating his highly original and creative reading of Hegel", and for assessing his Hegelian form of critical Marxism. She credited Marcuse with providing "detailed and careful commentary on Hegel's Logic and Phenomenology of Spirit", but noted that the work might have an "initially daunting character for the contemporary reader." She attributed its neglect in the literature on Marcuse and critical theory to the fact that it does not refer explicitly to Karl Marx and historical materialism, and argued that Marcuse, influenced by both Dilthey and Heidegger, did not succeed in the resolving the tensions between their approaches. She suggested that Marcuse might have been attempting to respond to a criticism of Hegel made by Heidegger in Being and Time (1927), according to which Hegel's phrase that "Spirit falls into time" obscures the fact that Spirit is already in time. She noted that Hegel's Ontology and the Theory of Historicity has "met with some skepticism" as an interpretation of Hegel, and that the centrality of the term "historicity" to Hegel's concerns has been questioned. Though defending its relevance to Hegel, she maintained that Marcuse's failure to define it "adds to the obliqueness if not the obscurity of some of his intentions."

She praised other parts of the work, calling his discussion of the dialectic of work and recognition "brilliant". Though pointing to similarities between Marcuse's views and Heidegger's, she noted that there were also differences, and that a "Heideggerian objection" to the work would be "that it contains no clear distinction between the "world-historical" dimension and the "historicity" proper to Dasein. She suggested that Heidegger might have rejected it as a Habilitationsschrift had the opportunity to do so arisen. She disputed Robert B. Pippin's view that the work provides the basis for many elements of a full critical theory, but also rejected Jean-Michel Palmier's view that it was made obsolete by Marcuse's subsequent study on Hegel, Reason and Revolution (1941). She criticized Marcuse for the style of his work in the original German, and for failing to properly describe the role of narrativity in human existence, but argued that Eros and Civilization (1955) continues his interest in historicity and helped make up for the deficiencies of his earlier work.

Russell Rockwell considered Hegel's Ontology and the Theory of Historicity a major work on Hegel, and noted that it presented a more thorough investigation of the social relevance of Hegel's absolute idea than did Marcuse's subsequent work Reason and Revolution (1941), the discussion in the latter work being an abbreviated version of that in the former.

See also
 Ontology

References

Bibliography
Books

 
 

Journals

 
  
  
  
  
  

1932 non-fiction books
Books about Georg Wilhelm Friedrich Hegel
German non-fiction books
German philosophy
Works by Herbert Marcuse